Pyatiletka is a rural locality (a selo) in Kosteksky Selsoviet, Khasavyurtovsky District, Republic of Dagestan, Russia. The population was 1,184 as of 2010. There are 21 streets.

Geography 
Pyatiletka is located 39 km northeast of Khasavyurt (the district's administrative centre) by road. Akaro is the nearest rural locality.

References 

Rural localities in Khasavyurtovsky District